Mandarin Airlines is a Taiwanese regional airline based in Taipei, Taiwan, whose parent company is China Airlines. The airline operates domestic and regional international flights, while its parent company focuses on international operations.  Some charter services are also operated by the company. Its main base is Songshan Airport, Taichung International Airport and Kaohsiung International Airport.

History

Mandarin Airlines was established on 1 June 1991, and was initially a joint venture by China Airlines (67%) and Koos Group (33%); the Chinese name of the company is formed by the combination of the two. The establishment of Mandarin Airlines is closely related to the political status of Taiwan. At the time, Mandarin Airlines' parent company, China Airlines, still served as the flag carrier of the Republic of China, with the flag of the Republic of China a part of its livery.  Denying the existence of the Taipei government, the People's Republic of China hence attempted to boycott the international presence of China Airlines, using trade barriers to achieve its political goal.  However, PRC's objection did not extend to other Taiwanese carriers not carrying the ROC flag.  As a way to work around these limits, Mandarin Airlines was founded while China Airlines maintained its role as the flag carrier.

On 16 October 1991, Mandarin Airlines started operations with direct flights from Taipei to Sydney in Australia. The next step was the opening of a direct air route to Vancouver in Canada on 7 December 1991. Thus, Mandarin Airlines became Taiwan's first airline to fly direct to Australia and Canada. The China Trust Group pulled its investment in Mandarin Airlines on 31 October 1992, turning the airline into a company virtually wholly owned by China Airlines (90.05%) by December 1992. Also, Mandarin Airlines' role was changed to that of a primary domestic and short-range intra-regional airline, after parent China Airlines was able to re-establish its emphasis on international routes, due to a new livery that did not include the national flag, and thus faced less objection from the PRC.

On 8 August 1999, China Airlines formally merged its subsidiary, Mandarin Airlines, with Formosa Airlines under the Mandarin name. Mandarin took over Formosa's domestic operations and aircraft while Mandarin's fleet and most of its international flights were transferred to China Airlines. In early 2000, the airline bought 5 Dornier 228 from Uni Air to fly outlying routes. These planes were sold to Daily Air in 2005, a helicopter carrier in Taiwan which had won the bid to fly these money-losing routes.

Mandarin Airlines is owned by China Airlines (93.99%) and has 630 employees (as of March 2007).

Corporate affairs

The headquarters is currently in Songshan District, Taipei.

Previously the headquarters was in a different building in Taipei.

Logo
The airline uses Hai Tung Ching, a gyrfalcon from a Chinese legend, as its logo.

Destinations

Mandarin Airlines operates the following services as of November 2012  Destinations in China may include scheduled charter service or indirect routing which transit through other countries.

Codeshare agreements
As of November 2012, Mandarin Airlines has codeshare agreements with the following airlines:

Fleet

Current fleet
, Mandarin Airlines operates the following aircraft:

Mandarin Airlines announced the lease of eight Embraer 190 aircraft from GE Commercial Aviation Services in December 2005 to replace the aging Fokker 50 and Fokker 100s in its fleet. Mandarin Airlines' E-190's featured a refreshed livery, with the first aircraft delivered in May 2007, becoming the first, and to date the only, Taiwanese airline to use this type of aircraft. On 27 October 2009, Mandarin Airlines retired its last Fokker 100 aircraft, ending this type's 14-year service with the airline. On 19 July 2017 Mandarin Airlines placed orders for six ATR 72-600 aircraft to be delivered in 2018.

Retired fleet
Mandarin Airlines formerly operated the following aircraft:

Accidents and incidents

On August 22, 1999, China Airlines Flight 642 crashed while landing at Hong Kong International Airport, resulting in three fatalities. The flight was operated by a Mandarin Airlines McDonnell Douglas MD-11.

On December 6, 2006, Mandarin Airlines Flight 1261 flew from Taipei to Kinmen. After a normal landing at Jinmen Airport, it was found that a wheel of the front landing gear had fallen off. Later, the wheel was found next to the runway of Songshan Airport, there were no casualties. 

On 17 August 2012, Mandarin Airlines Flight 369 experienced a runway excursion during heavy rain due to improper landing and deceleration technique on runway 20 at Magong airport. The E-190 aircraft was intentionally steered off the side of the runway and struck the base of four concrete runway lights causing the nose gear to collapse. No injuries were reported for the accident.

See also

 List of airlines of Taiwan
 Air transport in Taiwan
 List of airports in Taiwan
 List of companies of Taiwan
 Transportation in Taiwan
 China Airlines

References

External links

Mandarin Airlines
Mandarin Airlines 
Mandarin Airlines Fleet

Airlines of Taiwan
Airlines established in 1991
Government-owned airlines
China Airlines Group
SkyTeam affiliate members
Taiwanese companies established in 1991
Taiwanese brands
Companies based in Taipei